The Wehmerhorster Bach  is a stream in North Rhine-Westphalia, Germany which rises on the Maschberg. It flows into the Schierenbeke near Rödinghausen.

See also
List of rivers of North Rhine-Westphalia

Rivers of North Rhine-Westphalia
Rivers of Germany